Oz (styled as OZ) is a Finnish heavy metal band, originally from Nakkila, Finland. It was formed in 1977, split in 1991 and re-established 2010.

Since 1983, OZ has been active mostly in Sweden as the band members moved to Stockholm after the release of their second album. In 2010,  drummer Mark Ruffneck (born Pekka Mark), bassist and main songwriter Jay C. Blade (born Jukka Homi, but has changed his name to Jukka Lewis) and vocalist Ape De Martini (born Tapani Hämäläinen) re-formed the band, together with Costello Hautamäki and Markku Petander. As of 2016, OZ consists of four different members from Pori, Finland with Ruffneck being the original sole member.

They made a splash with their 1983 album Fire in the Brain, a NWOBHM-flavored energetic metal affair that won over critics and fans alike. The subsequent albums, however, failed to elicit the same response, and the band faded from worldwide view. The band reformed in 2010 and released Burning Leather in 2011. The album Transition State was released on 20 October 2017 by AFM Records. The latest album "Forced Commandments" released 22/5 2020 by Massacre Records.

Line-up

Current members
 Mark Ruffneck (Pekka Mark) – drums, percussion (1977–1991, 2010–present)
 Peppi Peltola - bass, vocals (2015–present)
 Juzzy Kangas - guitars, vocals (2015–present)
 Johnny Cross - guitars, vocals (2015–present)
 Vince Koivula – lead vocals (2016–present)

Former live musicians
 Michel Santunione - guitar 
 John Berg - guitar
 Johannes Sandberg - bass

Former members
 Ape De Martini (Tapani Hämäläinen) – lead vocals (1977–1991, 2010–2016)
 Jay C. Blade (Jukka Lewis) – bass, vocals (1982–1987, 2010–2016)
 Markku Petander – guitars (2010–2011)
 Costello Hautamäki - guitars (2010)
 Michael Lundholm – guitars (1990–1991)
 Jörgen Schelander – keyboards (1990–1991)
 Fredrik Thörnholm – bass (1990–1991)
 Tobbe Moen – bass (1990)
 Spooky Wolff – guitars (1983–1987)
 Speedy Foxx – guitars (1983–1987)
 Esa Niva – guitars (1982–1983)
 Tauno Vajavaara – bass (1977-1982)
 Kari Elo – guitars (1977-1982)

Discography

Studio albums
Heavy Metal Heroes (OZ) (1982)
Fire in the Brain (1983)
III Warning (1984)
...Decibel Storm... (1986)
Roll the Dice (1991)
Dominator (Promo CD) (2011)
 Burning Leather (2011)
 Transition State (2017)
 Forced Commandments (2020)

EPs
1984 – Turn the Cross Upside Down

Singles
1982 – "Second-Hand Lady" / "Rather Knight"
2011 - "Dominator"
2012 – "The Show Must Go On" / "Signs from the Dead"

Compilation albums
1987 – III Warning + ...Decibel Storm...
2012 – Vinyl Tracks

See also
 New wave of British heavy metal

References

External links
 The band's official website
 Page on the band on Metal Archives
 Real Audio Files of Fire in The Brain

Finnish heavy metal musical groups
Swedish heavy metal musical groups
Combat Records artists
Black Mark Production artists
Massacre Records artists
RCA Records artists
AFM Records artists